Uzunyurt can refer to:

 Uzunyurt, Fethiye
 Uzunyurt, Kargı